Tiétar is a municipality located in the province of Cáceres, Extremadura, Spain. According to the 2013 census (INE), the municipality has a population of 948 inhabitants. Tiétar broke away of Talayuela on 1 July 2011.

References

Municipalities in the Province of Cáceres